Cettin also known as Saint Cettin of Oran or Cethach, Cetagh  and Cethagh was a disciple of Saint Patrick. He helped St. Patrick in evangelizing in Ireland. St. Patrick consecrated him as an auxiliary bishop of Oran. He is believed to have died in 5th century. His feast day is 16 June. His shrine at Oran, County Roscommon was a well known place of pilgrimage, and survived until the end of the eighteenth century.

In popular culture
Saint Cettin is referred to by the character Patrick Braden in the novel Breakfast on Pluto by Irish novelist Patrick McCabe as well as its film adaptation.

References

5th-century Christian saints
Medieval Irish saints
5th-century Irish bishops